The small white-toothed rat (Berylmys berdmorei) is a species of rodent in the family Muridae.
It is found in Cambodia, Laos, Myanmar, Thailand, and Vietnam.

References

Berylmys
Mammals of Asia
Mammals described in 1851
Taxa named by Edward Blyth
Taxonomy articles created by Polbot